Ramunė Arlauskienė (born 23 March 1973) is a Lithuanian mountain bike orienteer. She won a bronze medal in the middle distance at the 2005 World MTB Orienteering Championships, behind Michaela Gigon and Christine Schaffner-Räber. She placed 22nd in the long distance, and her team placed ninth in the relay.

References

1973 births
Lithuanian orienteers
Female orienteers
Lithuanian female cyclists
Mountain bike orienteers
Living people